The Talent League Girls (also known as the Coates Talent League Girls under naming rights and previously as the NAB League Girls and TAC Cup Girls) is an under-19 Australian rules football representative competition held in Australia. It is based on geographic regions throughout country Victoria and metropolitan Melbourne with each team representing twelve Victorian regions, while a thirteenth team from Tasmania was introduced in 2019. 

The league is one of the leading competitions for female footballers to be recruited to AFL Women's (AFLW) clubs. An identical competition for male footballers, known as the Talent League Boys, is also contested on an annual basis.

History
The league was inaugurated in 2017, the same year as the first AFL Women's premiership season was held. All NAB League Boys clubs entered teams and shared training grounds. Reaction to the establishment was positive, with Fiona Richardson, Victorian Minister for Women, praising the league for its encouragement of women's sports.  vice-captain Madeline Keryk said the competition helped equalise opportunities for boys and girls in junior football.

The first season was a five-round competition. The Calder Cannons won all five of their matches and overcame the Murray Bushrangers on percentage to claim the inaugural premiership. The second season was a nine-round competition culminating in a grand final. The inaugural grand finalists were the Geelong Falcons and the Northern Knights. The Falcons won 32–21, completing an unbeaten season. The competition has since grown in fixture length and incorporates a team from Tasmania. The 2020 season was abandoned due to the impact of the COVID-19 pandemic.

The league was known as the TAC Cup Girls in 2017 to 2018, NAB League Girls in 2019 to 2022, and since 2023 it has been known as the Coates Talent League Girls.

Age eligibility
The competition was originally classified as an under-18 competition, though in 2021 the competition was classified as an under-19 competition. The draft age for both the AFL and AFLW Draft is 18. Since 2023 the league has been primarily by under-18 players, with a selection of under-19 players also listed.

Premiers

Best and Fairest Award

External links
Official website

References

 
Australian rules football competitions in Victoria (Australia)
Recurring sporting events established in 2017
2017 establishments in Australia
Sports leagues established in 2017
NAB League Girls